Air Base Ground Defense (ABGD) is the operational term used by the United States Air Force to denote ground combat operations in defense of U.S. Air Force bases. This specialty is filled by members of the Air Force Security Forces, who serve not only as military law enforcement officers, but also as ground combat troops in defense of U.S. air bases around the world. In this capacity, their duties are similar to those performed by the RAF Regiment and Royal Air Force Police of the United Kingdom, namely, to conduct ground combat operations as highly trained infantry troops, law enforcement and security in defense of U.S. air bases. Camp Bullis in Texas is where all levels of Air Base Ground Defense (ABGD) are instructed, the course ranges in length from 4–6 weeks. In these weeks of training Air Force Security Forces are taught to operate the following weapons: M-4 Carbine, M-9, M-203, M-240B, M-249 (SAW), MK-19, M67 (hand grenade), M18A1 (Claymore mine), and the M-72 (LAW rocket), M-60 as well as other base defense weapons and tools. In 1966-1969, sentry dog teams used the Smith & Wesson K-38 Combat Masterpiece.

Under the Interservice Agreement between the United States Air Force and the United States Army, the U.S. Air Force is responsible for ground combat operations to defend U.S. air bases. Air Force Security Forces fulfill this mission, and, as such, are trained in the whole range of infantry tactics, to include patrolling, close quarters battle, defense in depth, crew-served weapons, and other ground combat tactics.

In the United States Marine Corps the role of ABGD primarily rests with the Low Altitude Air Defense Battalions and Marine Wing Support Squadrons.

United States Air Force